Hadameh-ye Vosta (also Romanized as Hadāmeh-ye Vosţá and Ḩaddāmeh-ye Vosţá; also known as Hadāmeh-ye Mīānī, Ḩaddāmeh, Haddāmeh-ye Dovom, Ḩaddāmeh-ye Soflá, and Haddāmeh-ye Yakom) is a village in Jarahi Rural District, in the Central District of Mahshahr County, Khuzestan Province, Iran. At the 2006 census, its population was 37, in 7 families.

References 

Populated places in Mahshahr County